The following is a list of lieutenant governors of the State of Connecticut.

Lieutenant governors of the State of Connecticut, 1776–present

Notes

References
Constitutions

 
 
 

Specific

External links
Official website of the Lieutenant Governor

Connecticut
 
Connecticut